Jean Galbraith (28 March 1906 – 2 January 1999) was an Australian botanist, gardener, writer of children's books and poet.

Galbraith was born at Tyers, Gippsland, where she lived for her whole life. The family's sprawling native garden at their cottage "Dunedin" formed the backdrop to her first articles on growing native flowers. As a teenager, Galbraith joined the Field Naturalist Club and began to train herself in botany. Despite her lack of formal qualifications, Galbraith became a highly respected botanist. She was counted an "important and influential woman gardener", and "natural successor" to Edna Walling.

Galbraith used the pseudonym "Correa" for her early works. She first started writing at the age of 19, and was widely published from the age of 26. For 50 years she contributed monthly to two magazines, The Garden Lover and the Victorian Naturalist, as well as occasional articles for The Age. Galbraith collected some of her Garden Lover articles and published them in 1939 as Garden in a Valley'''.

The species Prostanthera galbraithiae was named for Galbraith as co-discover of the species and advocate for its protection. In 1936 she donated the first wildflower sanctuary in Victoria, established by the Native Plants Preservation Society of Victoria at Tyers, near Traralgon in Victoria's LaTrobe Valley. She was recipient of the 1970 Australian Natural History Medallion

In addition to poetry Galbraith also wrote the lyrics for hymns, such as "O Christ our Lord whose beauty". "She held a deep Christian (Christadelphian) faith which sustained her at all times".

In 1993, rare aniseed boronia, Boronia galbraithiae was named in her honour.

Works
In all Galbraith wrote ten books:

Botany and gardening:
 Wildflowers of Victoria, 1967 	
 A field guide to the wild flowers of south-east Australia, 1977
 A gardener's year, 1987
 A garden lover's journal (1943–1946), 1989
 Wildflower diary, Winifred Waddell, Jean Galbraith, Elizabeth Cochrane, 1976
 Fruits, Jean Galbraith, John Truscott, 1966

Books for children:
 Grandma Honeypot, 1963
 The wonderful butterfly; the magic of growth in nature, 1968
 From flower to fruit, Jean Galbraith, Moira Pye, 1965	

Autobiography:
 Garden in a valley, Jean Galbraith – Biography and autobiography, 1985	
 Doongalla restored: the story of a garden, 1991, 123pp (First published in The Australian Garden Lover' between 1939 and 1941 under the title Two and a Garden)
 Kindred spirits: a botanical correspondence, Anne Latreille, Jean Galbraith, Australian Garden History Society, 1999

Poetry:
 Poems for Peter,
She also wrote regularly for the NSW School Magazine, ran a series of broadcasts on the ABC for children, and in 1964 and 1965, contributed a monthly page for the Educational Magazine called "Beauty in Distress – a plea for the preservation of our native plants".

References

 Latreille, A. (2002), 'Galbraith, Jean ('Correa')', in R. Aitken and M. Looker (eds), Oxford Companion to Australian Gardens'', South Melbourne, Oxford University Press, pp. 241–42.

External links
  (Open Access)
 
 Jean Galbraith in 1926
 A Day with Jean Galbraith Based on a 1990 interview this ABC Radio National explores her relationships with her family and friends.

1906 births
1999 deaths
20th-century Australian botanists
Australian gardeners
Australian children's writers
Christadelphians
Australian Christians
20th-century Australian poets
Australian women poets
20th-century Australian women writers
Australian women children's writers
Garden writers